State Road 525 (NM 525) is a  state highway in the US state of New Mexico. NM 525's southern terminus is at the entrance to Stallion Site Camp, and the northern terminus is at U.S. Route 380 (US 380) east of San Antonio.

Major intersections

See also

References

525
Transportation in Socorro County, New Mexico